Iris is a 1916 British silent romance film directed by Cecil M. Hepworth and starring Henry Ainley, Alma Taylor and Stewart Rome. It is based on the 1901 play Iris by Arthur Wing Pinero.

Cast
 Henry Ainley as Maldonado 
 Alma Taylor as Iris  
 Stewart Rome as Lawrence Trenwith 
 Violet Hopson

Reception
Similar to American films of the time, Iris was submitted for review and was subject to cuts by American city and state film censorship boards. The Chicago Board of Censors issued an Adults Only permit for the British film.

References

Bibliography
 Goble, Alan. The Complete Index to Literary Sources in Film. Walter de Gruyter, 1999.

External links

1916 films
1910s romance films
British romance films
British silent feature films
1910s English-language films
Films directed by Cecil Hepworth
British films based on plays
British black-and-white films
Hepworth Pictures films
1910s British films